Kalininsky District is an administrative and municipal district (raion), one of the thirty-eight in Saratov Oblast, Russia. It is located in the west of the oblast. Its administrative center is the town of Kalininsk. Population: 33,302 (2010 Census);  The population of Kalininsk accounts for 49.4% of the district's total population.

References

Notes

Sources

Districts of Saratov Oblast